Olga Bucătaru (March 27, 1942, Suceava – April 10, 2020, Bucharest) was a Romanian film and stage actress.

She graduated in 1965 from the Caragiale National University of Theatre and Film. In 2002 she was awarded the National Order of Faithful Service, knight class. She died on April 10, 2020, from a heart attack.

Filmography (partial list)
 Bariera (1972) – Lucica
 Cursa (1975)
 Serenadă pentru etajul XII (1976) – Silvia
 The Mace with Three Seals (1977) – Lady Stanca
 Ecaterina Teodoroiu (1978) – Dr. Lucreția
 Dumbrava minunată (1980) – Spring
 Oglinda (1993) – Queen Mother Helen
 Train of Life (1998) – Femme Wagon
 Iubire și onoare (2010) – Veta
 Când mama nu-i acasă (2017) – Profira
 Fructul oprit (2018) – Katia's mother

References

External links 
 

1942 births
2020 deaths
Romanian film actresses
Romanian stage actresses
Recipients of the National Order of Faithful Service
People from Suceava
Caragiale National University of Theatre and Film alumni